Red Hill Historic District is a national historic district located in Red Hill, Montgomery County, Pennsylvania. It encompasses 163 contributing buildings in the working-class borough of Red Hill.  The district includes a number of brick workers' housing, 19th century Gothic style cottages, Queen Anne style rowhouses, and 20th century bungalows.  Notable buildings include the S.C. Moyer Cigar factory (c. 1880), Red Hill Hotel (1811), firehouse (1924), Miller and Kline cigar factory, and Hillegass House.

It was added to the National Register of Historic Places in 1985.

References

Historic districts on the National Register of Historic Places in Pennsylvania
Gothic Revival architecture in Pennsylvania
Queen Anne architecture in Pennsylvania
Historic districts in Montgomery County, Pennsylvania
National Register of Historic Places in Montgomery County, Pennsylvania